Boley Springs is an unincorporated community in Fayette County, Alabama, United States. A post office operated under the name Boley Springs from 1877 to 1887.

This community was involved with the tornadoes that hit the state on April 27, 2011.

References

Unincorporated communities in Fayette County, Alabama
Unincorporated communities in Alabama